Unrequited love or one-sided love is love that is not openly reciprocated or understood as such by the beloved. The beloved may not be aware of the admirer's deep and pure affection, or may consciously reject it. The Merriam Webster Online Dictionary defines unrequited as "not reciprocated or returned in kind".

Psychiatrist Eric Berne states in his book Sex in Human Loving that "Some say that one-sided love is better than none, but like half a loaf of bread, it is likely to grow hard and moldy sooner." However, the philosopher Friedrich Nietzsche contends that "indispensable...to the lover is his unrequited love, which he would at no price relinquish for a state of indifference." Unrequited love stands in contrast to redamancy, the act of reciprocal love.

Analysis

Route to unrequited love 
According to Dr. Roy Baumeister, what makes a person desirable is a complex and highly personal mix of many qualities and traits. But falling for someone who is much more desirable than oneself — whether because of physical beauty or attributes like charm, intelligence, wit or status — Baumeister calls this kind of mismatch "prone to find their love unrequited" and that such relationships are falling upward. According  to some psychologists opposites do attract.

'Platonic friendships provide a fertile soil for unrequited love'. Thus the object of unrequited love is often a friend or acquaintance, someone regularly encountered in the workplace, during the course of work, school or other activities involving large groups of people. This creates an awkward situation in which the admirer has difficulty in expressing their true feelings, a fear that revelation of feelings might invite rejection, cause embarrassment or might end all access to the beloved, as a romantic relationship may be inconsistent with the existing association.

Unrequited love victims
The inability of the unrequited lover to express or declare their love often leads to negative feelings such as depression, low self-esteem, anxiety and rapid mood swings between depression and euphoria.

Rejecters
'There are two bad sides to unrequited love, but only one is made familiar by our culture' – that of the lover, not the rejector. In fact, research suggests that the object of unrequited affection experiences a variety of negative emotions on a par with those of the suitor, including anxiety, frustration, and guilt. As Freud long since pointed out, 'when a woman sues for love, to reject and refuse is a distressing part for a man to play'.

Advantages
 
Unrequited love has long been depicted as noble, an unselfish and stoic willingness to accept suffering. Literary and artistic depictions of unrequited love may depend on assumptions of social distance that have less relevance in western, democratic societies with relatively high social mobility and less rigid codes of sexual fidelity. Nonetheless, the literary record suggests a degree of euphoria in the feelings associated with unrequited love, which has the advantage as well of carrying none of the responsibilities of mutual relationships: certainly, "rejection, apparent or real, may be the catalyst for inspired literary creation... 'the poetry of frustration'."

Eric Berne considered that "the man who is loved by a woman is lucky indeed, but the one to be envied is he who loves, however little he gets in return. How much greater is Dante gazing at Beatrice than Beatrice walking by him in apparent disdain".

"Remedies"
Roman poet Ovid in his Remedia Amoris "provides advice on how to overcome inappropriate or unrequited love. The solutions offered include travel, teetotalism, bucolic pursuits, and ironically, avoidance of love poets".

Cultural examples

Western 
In the wake of his real-life experiences with Maud Gonne, W. B. Yeats wrote of those who 'had read/All I had rhymed of that monstrous thing/Returned and yet unrequited love'. 
According to Robert B. Pippin, Proust claimed that 'the only successful (sustainable) love is unrequited love', something which according to Pippin, 'has been invoked as a figure for the condition of modernity itself'.

Eastern
The medieval Japanese poet Saigyō may have turned from samurai to monk because of unrequited love, one of his waka asking: "What turned me to wanting/to break with the world-bound life?/Maybe the one whose love/turned to loathing and who now joins with me in a different joy".  In other poems he wrote: "Alas, I'm foreordained to suffer, loving deep a heartless lass....Would I could know if there be such in far-off China!"

In China, passion tends to be associated not with happiness, but with sorrow and unrequited love.

See also

References

Further reading
Robert Burton, The Anatomy of Melancholy (New York 1951) THE THIRD PARTITION: LOVE-MELANCHOLY
J. Reid Meloy, Violent Attachments (1997)
Peabody, Susan 1989, 1994, 2005, "Addiction to Love: Overcoming Obsession and Dependency in Relationships."

External links

Grief
Love
Non-sexuality
Philosophy of love
Asymmetry

ca:Amor no correspost